Varnakkazchchakal is a 2000 Indian Malayalam film, directed Sundar Das. The film stars Dileep, Poornima Mohan, Sishwa and Jagathy Sreekumar in lead roles. The film had musical score by Mohan Sithara.

Plot
They story deals with aristocratic family and its filial defects. Kunju is the youngest member of the aristocratic family. He has an elder brother, Sudhakaran Menon whom everyone respects and fears. Kunju's sister-in-law is led by greed and halts any marriage proposals coming to Kunju to avoid sharing family wealth. Kunju's brother also follows his wife's lead in this matter. However, the elder brother's business deals result in losses which puts the family's livelihood at stake. His pride makes him fall further into debt. 

Kunju suffers from schizophreniform disorder after witnessing the death of his girlfriend Malavika during his college days in Palakkad. He falls in love with a lower-class woman, Sridevi despite objections of his family. Sudhakaran Menon gets cheated by his lawyer and their clay factory is confiscated through illegal means. This disturbs Kunju and he attacks the new owners in a psychotic fit and kills those who cheated them. Sudhakaran Menon asks Kunju forgiveness for his misdoings. The court absolves Kunju from his actions citing his mental disorder. Eventually, Kunju unites with Sridevi.

Cast
 
Dileep as Kunju
Poornima Mohan as Sreedevi/Cheeru
Sishwa as Malavika
Sangeetha as Susan
Jagathy Sreekumar as Kaimal 
KPAC Lalitha as Kunju's mother
Kalabhavan Mani as Kunjandi
Ambika as Bhagyalakshmi 
Bindu Panicker as Saumini 
KPAC Premachandran as Renuka's father
K. T. S. Padannayil as Damu's relative
Lena  as Renuka
Mala Aravindan as Chathutti 
Manka Mahesh as Renuka's mother
N. F. Varghese as Sudhakaran Menon
Oduvil Unnikrishnan as Pothuval
Ponnamma Babu  as Subadra
Ravi Menon as Subadra's husband
Risabava as Thomachan
Sreenath as Advocate
Jagannatha Varma as Malavika's father
Sruthi Lakshmi as Child artist
Chandrika
Kozhikode Sarada as Kali
Nandu Pothuval  as Peon
Sreehari as Damu

Soundtrack
The music was composed by Mohan Sithara and lyrics were written by Yusufali Kechery.

References

External links
 

2000 films
Indian comedy-drama films
2000s Malayalam-language films
Films scored by Mohan Sithara
Films directed by Sundar Das